California Girls is a 1985 American made-for-television comedy-drama film starring Robby Benson and Martin Mull, directed by Rick Wallace. It originally aired on ABC on March 24, 1985.

Plot
A Jersey City auto mechanic travels to California in search of his dream girl, the "California Girl", a girl he saw in cosmetics commercials.  He meets the woman of his dreams and a Hollywood photographer, who show him the good life of Los Angeles.  The "dream girl" convinces him to follow his dreams and open his own garage with an inheritance from his father.  However, the manager may have other plans, and he sees that having his own business is not as hunky dory as he believed.  He is a great mechanic, but, because he lacks business acumen, he ends up doing all the hard work at the garage.

He is left high and dry as the business goes belly up, the manager skips town, and his girlfriend has a new beau, thereby throwing him out on the street, just as a California earthquake strikes.  Turns out, it is all a dream/nightmare, and the mechanic has second thoughts about going to California after all, but is convinced by his bowling buddy to give it a shot.  Upon arrival, he is shocked to learn that it is not much different from his hometown, i.e., rude people, dreary weather, until he meets a nice, down-to-earth woman who also came from New Jersey.

Cast
Robby Benson as Nathan Bowzer
Martin Mull as Elliot
Charles Rocket as Barry
Ernie Hudson as Ernie
Tawny Kitaen as Karen Malone
Doris Roberts as Mrs. Bowzer
Robert Pastorelli as Mechanic
Norman Alden as Mr. Pegem 
Zsa Zsa Gabor as herself
Regis Philbin as himself 
Martha Longley as Heather
 Robert Firth as Sean
Robert Parucha as Corky

References

External links

1985 films
1985 television films
American television films
ABC network original films
Films about dreams
1980s English-language films
Films scored by Mark Snow
Films set in California
Films set in New Jersey
1985 comedy-drama films
Teen sex comedy films